Mounir Makhchoun (born 7 September 1994) is a Moroccan cyclist, who last rode for UCI Continental team .

Major results

2014
 9th Trophée de la Maison Royale, Challenge du Prince
2015
 Challenge du Prince
5th Trophée Princier
10th Trophée de la Maison Royale
 7th Grand prix de Khouribga, Challenge des phosphates
2016
 1st Overall Tour d'Egypte
1st Young rider classification
 1st Stage 4 Tour du Cameroun
 2nd Trophée de l'Anniversaire, Challenge du Prince
2017
 2nd GP Al Massira, Les Challenges de la Marche Verte
 Challenge du Prince
8th Trophée de la Maison Royale
9th Trophée Princier
2018
 2nd Overall Grand Prix International de la ville d'Alger
2022
 1st Stage 5 Tour du Cameroun

References

External links

1994 births
Living people
Moroccan male cyclists
20th-century Moroccan people
21st-century Moroccan people